Sir Joseph Norman Lockyer  (17 May 1836 – 16 August 1920) was an English scientist and astronomer. Along with the French scientist Pierre Janssen, he is credited with discovering the gas helium.  Lockyer also is remembered for being the founder and first editor of the influential journal Nature.

Biography

Lockyer was born in Rugby, Warwickshire. His early introduction to science was through his father, who was a pioneer of the electric telegraph. After a conventional schooling supplemented by travel in Switzerland and France, he worked for some years as a civil servant in the British War Office. He settled in Wimbledon, South London after marrying Winifred James, who helped translate at least four French scientific works into English. He was a keen amateur astronomer with a particular interest in the Sun. In 1885 he became the world's first professor of astronomical physics at the Royal College of Science, South Kensington, now part of Imperial College. At the college, the Solar Physics Observatory was built for him and here he directed research until 1913.

In the 1860s Lockyer became fascinated by electromagnetic spectroscopy as an analytical tool for determining the composition of heavenly bodies. He conducted his research from his new home in West Hampstead, with a -inch telescope which he had already used in Wimbledon.

In 1868 a prominent yellow line was observed in a spectrum taken near the edge of the Sun. Its wavelength was about 588 nm, slightly less than the so-called "D" lines of sodium. The line could not be explained as due to any material known at the time, and so it was suggested by Lockyer, after he had observed it from London, that the yellow line was caused by an unknown solar element. He named this element helium after the Greek word 'Helios' meaning 'sun'. An observation of the new yellow line had been made earlier by Janssen at the 18 August 1868 solar eclipse, and because their papers reached the French academy on the same day, he and Lockyer usually are awarded joint credit for helium's discovery. Terrestrial helium was found about 27 years later by the Scottish chemist William Ramsay.  In his work on the identification of helium, Lockyer collaborated with the noted chemist Edward Frankland.

To facilitate the transmission of ideas between scientific disciplines, Lockyer established the general science journal Nature in 1869. He was elected as a member of the American Philosophical Society in 1874. He remained its editor until shortly before his death.

Lockyer led eight expeditions to observe solar eclipses for example in 1870 to Sicily, 1871 to India and 1898 to India.

Lockyer is among the pioneers of archaeoastronomy. Travelling 1890 in Greece he noticed the east–west orientation of many temples, in Egypt he found an orientation of temples to sunrise at midsummer and towards Sirius. Assuming orientation of the Heel-Stone of Stonehenge to sunrise at midsummer he calculated the construction of the monument to have taken place in 1680 BC. Radiocarbon dating in 1952 gave a date of 1800 BC.  He also confirmed the alignment of the Parthenon on the rising point of the Pleiades and did extensive work on the solar and stellar alignments of Egyptian temples and their dating, presented in his book The Dawn Of Astronomy.

Lockyer's first wife Winifred née James died in 1879. They had six sons and two daughters in all. In 1903, Lockyer started a second marriage, to suffragist Mary Thomasina Brodhurst (née Browne). After his retirement in 1913, Lockyer established an observatory near his home in Salcombe Regis near Sidmouth, Devon. Originally known as the Hill Observatory, the site was renamed the Norman Lockyer Observatory after his death and directed by his fifth son William J.S. Lockyer. For a time the observatory was a part of the University of Exeter, but is now owned by the East Devon District Council, and run by the Norman Lockyer Observatory Society. The Norman Lockyer Chair in Astrophysics at the University of Exeter is currently held by Professor Tim Naylor, who is the member of the Astrophysics group there which studies star formation and extrasolar planets. Naylor was the lead scientist for the eSTAR Project.

Lockyer died at his home in Salcombe Regis in 1920, and was buried there in the churchyard of St Peter and St Mary.

Publications
  (1868–94)
 Questions on Astronomy (1870)
  (1873)
  (1873)
  (1878)
  (1878)
 Report to the Committee on Solar Physics on the Basic Lines Common to Spots and Prominences (1880)
  (1887)
  (1887)
  (1890)
 Penrose, F.C., (communicated by Joseph Norman Lockyer), The Orientation of Greek Temples, Nature, v.48, n.1228, 11 May 1893, pp. 42–43
  (1894)
 Norman Lockyer; William Rutherford (1896). The Rules of Golf: Being the St. Andrews Rules for the Game. Macmillan & Co. 
  (1897)
 Recent and Coming Eclipses (1900)
  (1900)
  (1903)
 Stonehenge and Other British Stone Monuments Astronomically Considered (1906; second edition, 1909)
  (1907)
  (1909)
  (1910)

Honours and awards

 Fellow of the Royal Society (1869)
 Janssen Medal, Paris Academy of Sciences (1875)
 Knight Commander of the Order of the Bath (1897)
 President, British Association (1903 – 1904)
 The crater Lockyer on the Moon and the crater Lockyer on Mars are both named after him.

References

Further reading
 - A biography of Lockyer

External links

  Norman Lockyer Observatory & James Lockyer Planetarium
 Archives of the Norman Lockyer Observatory (University of Exeter)
 Norman Lockyer Observatory radio station in Sidmouth
 Certificate of candidacy for Lockyer's election to the Royal Society
 Brief biography of Lockyer by Chris Plicht
 Prof. Tim Naylor, Norman Lockyer Professor of Astrophysics
 Astrophysics Group, University of Exeter
 The 1871 solar eclipse

1836 births
1920 deaths
People from Rugby, Warwickshire
Discoverers of chemical elements
Fellows of the Royal Society
English science writers
Knights Commander of the Order of the Bath
19th-century British astronomers
20th-century British astronomers
Helium
Spectroscopists
Nature (journal) editors